Rhuallt is a village in Denbighshire, Wales. There is one public house, The White House. Another public house, The Smithy Arms, closed permanently in or around 2014. Some elements of village life in Rhuallt were described in the BBC Domesday Project of 1986. Rhuallt is mostly in the community of Tremeirchion, with some outlying parts in Cwm, Denbighshire.

References

Villages in Denbighshire